Denise Ferguson is a New Zealand bishop in the Anglican Church of Australia. She has served as an assistant bishop in the Anglican Diocese of Adelaide since July 2019, and is the first woman to be appointed bishop in the Province of South Australia.

Ferguson was born in New Zealand, and prior to entering ministry served as a staffer to the New Zealand Defence Force. She commenced training for ministry at the age of 39, and began her ministry career in the Anglican Diocese of Wellington, where she was ordained as a lay reader in 1988 and as a deacon in 1999. Ferguson served as vicar of St Matthew's Palmerston North and then as Archdeacon of Manawatu. She later served as the Bishop's Chaplain for Ministry Discernment in the Diocese of Wellington, and her final position prior to relocating to Australia, Ferguson was the Canon Registrar for the Diocese of Waikato and Taranaki.

In 2014 Ferguson moved to Australia, where she worked in the Diocese of Brisbane as Rector of the Parish of East Redland as well as Archdeacon of Moreton.

Ferguson was consecrated as an assistant bishop in the Diocese of Adelaide on 21 July 2019. Her responsibilities involve parish visiting and liturgical roles, as well as oversight of three areas of ministry across South Australia: multicultural diversity in ministry, healthcare chaplaincies – covering both hospital and social service based care contexts – and ministry formation.

Ferguson is married to Martin, an army officer who put his career on hold to support her ministry training. She also has a daughter and is a grandmother.

References

21st-century Anglican bishops in Australia
Assistant bishops in the Anglican Diocese of Adelaide
Living people
New Zealand Anglican clergy
New Zealand emigrants to Australia
Year of birth missing (living people)
Women Anglican bishops